Cassidula plecotrematoides is a species of small air-breathing salt marsh snail, a pulmonate gastropod mollusk in the family Ellobiidae.

Subspecies 
 Cassidula plecotrematoides japonica Möllendorff, 1901
 Cassidula plecotrematoides plecotrematoides Möllendorff, 1901

Distribution 
Cassidula plecotrematoides japonica occurs in Japan and it is critically endangered and endangered (CR＋EN) there.

The conservation status of Cassidula plecotrematoides plecotrematoides is near threatened.

References

 Martins, A. M. d. F. 1998. The anatomy of Cassidula Ferussac, 1821 and a case for the revival of the Cassidulinae Odhner, 1925. In: Morton, B. (ed.) The Marine Biology of the South China Sea. Proceedings of the Third International Conference on the Marine Biology of the South China Sea, Hong Kong. pp. 25–42

External links 

Ellobiidae
Gastropods described in 1901